Lavonen is a surname. Notable people with the surname include:

Kuutti Lavonen (born 1960), Finnish painter, photographer, and graphic artist
Veikko Lavonen (born 1945), Finnish wrestler

Finnish-language surnames
Surnames of Finnish origin